Rex Ronan: Experimental Surgeon is an educational action video game developed by Sculptured Software and published by Raya Systems for the Super Nintendo Entertainment System. The game teaches players about the hazards of smoking tobacco cigarettes. The initial development of the game received support from the US Agency for Healthcare Research and Quality. It is a part of educational video game series from Raya that includes Captain Novolin, Packy and Marlon and Bronkie the Bronchiasaurus.

Gameplay and plot

Jake Westboro is a man with it all: a beautiful wife and child, a large house in the suburbs, and the massively-paying position of a major CEO for the Blackburn Tobacco Company. As a result of smoking since he was 15, however, Jake is now dying from the effects of the cigarettes that he once sold. An experimental surgeon, Rex Ronan, volunteers to shrink himself and a craft down to near-microscopic size, so he can travel inside of Jake's body and fight his various diseases; removing tar, nicotine, precancerous cells, and other deadly health hazards. However, the tobacco company are concerned that if Jake survives, he will speak to the world about the hazards of tobacco and accordingly ruin their business; so they secretly place microbots inside him en-masse in an attempt to stop Ronan from treating him. If Ronan dies from the evil killbots sent by the company, then so does the patient, Jake.

Evaluations
Richard M. Satava mentioned two evaluations in which a number of children (none of whom were more than 12 years old) played a prototype version of the game. The average of the results indicated children who experienced enjoyment and who showed an interest with regard to acquiring information about tobacco's effects on people. According to Richard L. Street and Timothy R. Manning, the target audience was children and teenagers in the age range of 10 to 16 years. In addition, when it comes to persons who take up smoking, those in the age range of 10 to 16 years are at the highest risk, according to Street and Manning.

References

External links

1994 video games
Action video games
Children's educational video games
Human body in popular culture
Medical video games
Nanotechnology in fiction
North America-exclusive video games
Super Nintendo Entertainment System games
Super Nintendo Entertainment System-only games
Video games about diseases
Video games about microbes
Video games about robots
Video games about size change
Video games developed in the United States